Andris Nelsons (born 18 November 1978) is a Latvian conductor who is currently the music director of the Boston Symphony Orchestra and the Gewandhauskapellmeister of the Leipzig Gewandhaus Orchestra. He has previously served as music director of the City of Birmingham Symphony Orchestra, chief conductor of the Nordwestdeutsche Philharmonie, and music director of the Latvian National Opera.

Early life
Nelsons was born in Riga. His mother founded the first early music ensemble in Latvia, and his father was a choral conductor, cellist, and teacher. At age five, his mother and stepfather (a choir conductor) took him to a performance of Wagner's Tannhäuser, which Nelsons refers to as a profoundly formative experience: "...it had a hypnotic effect on me. I was overwhelmed by the music. I cried when Tannhäuser died. I still think this was the biggest thing that happened in my childhood."

As a youth, Nelsons studied piano, and took up the trumpet at age 12. He also sang bass-baritone, with a special interest in early music, in his mother's ensemble. He studied for one summer at the Dartington International Summer School with Evelyn Tubb. He served as a trumpeter with the orchestra of the Latvian National Opera.

Conducting career
Nelsons studied conducting with Alexander Titov in Saint Petersburg, Russia and participated in conducting master classes with Neeme Järvi, Roberto Carnevale and Jorma Panula. He came to the attention of Mariss Jansons when he emergency-substituted with the Oslo Philharmonic in their trumpet section during an orchestra tour. Nelsons counts Jansons as a mentor and has been a conducting student with him since 2002.

In 2003, Nelsons became principal conductor of the Latvian National Opera. He concluded his tenure there after four years in 2007. In 2006, Nelsons became chief conductor of the Nordwestdeutsche Philharmonie of Herford, Germany, a post he held until the end of the 2008/09 season. His first conducting appearance at the Metropolitan Opera was in October 2009, a production of Turandot. In July 2010, Nelsons made his debut at the Bayreuth Festival, conducting a new production of Wagner's Lohengrin at the opening performance of the festival.

City of Birmingham Symphony Orchestra
In the UK, Nelsons's early work included studio concerts with the BBC Philharmonic in Manchester, and his first BBC Philharmonic concert at the Bridgewater Hall was in November 2007. In October 2007, the City of Birmingham Symphony Orchestra (CBSO) named Nelsons as its 12th principal conductor and music director, effective with the 2008/09 season, with an initial contract for three years. The appointment was unusual in that Nelsons had conducted the CBSO only in a private concert and in a recording session, without a public concert engagement, prior to being named to the post. His first public conducting appearance with the CBSO was on 11 November 2007 in a matinee concert, and his first subscription concert appearance with the CBSO was in March 2008. In July 2009, Nelsons extended his CBSO contract for an additional three years, through the 2013/14 season. In August 2012, the CBSO announced the extension of his CBSO contract formally through the 2014/15 season, and then for subsequent seasons on the basis of an annual rolling renewal. In October 2013, the CBSO announced the conclusion of Nelsons's tenure as music director after the end of the 2014/15 season.

Boston Symphony Orchestra
In the US, Nelsons made his first guest-conducting appearance with the Boston Symphony Orchestra (BSO) in March 2011, as an emergency substitute for James Levine at Carnegie Hall. He subsequently guest-conducted the BSO at the Tanglewood Music Festival in July 2012, and made his first appearance with the BSO at Symphony Hall, Boston in January 2013. In May 2013, the BSO named Nelsons as its 15th music director effective the 2014/15 season. His initial contract was for 5 years and stipulated 8 to 10 weeks of scheduled appearances in the first year of the contract and 12 weeks in subsequent years.

Nelsons held the title of Music Director Designate in the 2013/14 season. In August 2015, the BSO announced the extension of Nelsons's contract as music director through the 2021/22 season with a new contract, for eight years, that replaced the initial five-year contract, and also contained an evergreen clause for automatic renewal.  In October 2020, the BSO announced a further extension of Nelsons' contract as music director through August 2025, with an evergreen clause for automatic renewal.

Leipzig Gewandhaus Orchestra
Nelsons first guest-conducted the Leipzig Gewandhaus Orchestra in 2011. In September 2015, the orchestra announced the appointment of Nelsons as its next Gewandhauskapellmeister, effective with the 2017–2018 season, with an initial contract of 5 seasons.  In October 2020, the orchestra announced the most recent extension of his contract as Gewandhauskapellmeister through 31 July 2027.

Recording history
With the CBSO, Nelsons has recorded music of Pyotr Ilyich Tchaikovsky, Richard Strauss, and Igor Stravinsky for the Orfeo label. Separately from the CBSO, Nelsons has also recorded for the BR-Klassik label and for the label of the Concertgebouw Orchestra. Nelsons has also recorded commercially with the Boston Symphony Orchestra for Deutsche Grammophon, where their albums Under Stalin's Shadow, of the Symphony No 10 of Shostakovich, received a 2015 Grammy Award for best orchestral performance and Shostakovich: Under Stalin's Shadow - Symphonies Nos. 5, 8 & 9, received a 2016 Grammy Award for best orchestral performance. In 2018, he received another Grammy Award for best orchestral performance, for Shostakovich: Symphonies Nos. 4 & 11. In 2019 DG published Complete Beethoven symphonies with Andris Nelsons and Vienna Philharmonic (Wiener Philharmoniker).

In December 2019 and January 2020, Nelsons conducted for the first time the Vienna New Year's Concert with the Vienna Philharmonic Orchestra, where he performed the trumpet solo in the Postillon-Galopp of Hans Christian Lumbye, the first conductor to perform a solo in the Vienna New Year's Concert who is not a violinist.  The recording of this concert was released commercially on Sony Classical.

Personal life
Nelsons was formerly married to the Latvian soprano Kristīne Opolais. They met during Nelsons's tenure at Latvian National Opera, when she was a member of the Latvian National Opera chorus, and later became a solo singer with the company. The couple married in 2011. Their daughter, Adriana Anna, was born on 28 December 2011. The couple announced their divorce on 27 March 2018.  Nelsons remarried in April 2019, to the former Alice Heidler.

References

External links

 
 Andris Nelsons agency page at Konzertdirektion Schmid
 CBSO page on Nelsons announcement, 2007
 Interview with and biography of Andris Nelsons, cosmopolis.ch
 Lohengrin cast 2010, Bayreuth Festival
 Susan Hall, "Meeting Conductor Andris Nelsons". Berkshire Fine Arts, 17 March 2011
 Antonio Olmos, Ben Kape, and Christian Bennett, "Watch conductor Andris Nelsons rehearse with the CBSO". The Guardian, 5 June 2010
 

1978 births
Deutsche Grammophon artists
Grammy Award winners
Honorary Officers of the Order of the British Empire
Latvian conductors (music)
Male conductors (music)
Latvian expatriates in the United Kingdom
Latvian expatriates in the United States
Living people
Musicians from Riga
Articles containing video clips
21st-century conductors (music)
21st-century male musicians